Group Captain Hugh Patrick Ruffell Smith,  (1911 – 4 August 1980) was a British physician, pilot, and Royal Air Force officer. Established the foundational case studies for Crew Resource Management for NASA, Ames Research. Moffatt Field, California U.S.A. 1979 “NASA Technical Memorandum #7848: A Simulator Study of the Interaction of Pilot Workloads with Errors, Vigilance, and Decisions”  (Authored Throughout his career, he conducted research into flight safety and ergonomics. His obituary in The Times stated: "few aircraft flying today do not carry some evidence of his research into instrument presentation or cockpit layout". He was awarded the Air Force Cross three times.

References

1911 births
1980 deaths
20th-century British medical doctors
Recipients of the Air Force Cross (United Kingdom)
Royal Air Force officers
Royal Air Force personnel of World War II